Gwangpo Bay is located in Sacheon city, South Korea. The Bay is located at the estuary of Gonyang Stream, and the city is located in the middle of the southern seashore of South Korea. Gwangpo Bay is a part of larger Sacheon Bay, which is surrounded by Sacheon City, Gwangyang City, and Namhae County.

According to Korean Ministry of Land, Transportation, and Marine Affairs, a plan made by local government in 2008 to reclaim Gwangpo Bay covers area of 1,976,256 square meter. The length of the Bay is about 3 kilo meter, and the width of the Bay is about 1.3 kilo meter.

Wildlife
According to Sacheon Branch of Korean Federation for Environmental Movement (Friends of the Earth Korea), 117 species of birds were found in this bay by the research conducted from 2000 to 2007. During the research, 150 Saunders's gulls were found together. White-naped cranes and black-faced spoonbills were also found here.

A large area of the bay is covered with seashore lawn grass (Zoysia sinica), and it is estimated that this is the biggest community of this species in Korea. Communities of a threatened species  of Ellobium chinense, which belongs to the mollusc family Ellobiidae  were found in June 2008  inside the community of seashore lawn grass.

And a community of eelgrass (Zostera marina) was found in the Gwangpo Bay. According to research conducted in Gwangyang Bay, next to Gwangpo Bay, 57 species of fishes were found in the eelgrass.

Socioeconomics

Population
The population of Sacheon City is about 110,000. The population was steady for the decade from 1995 to 2005. And while the fishers and farmers population decreased, some people migrated to Sacheon from 2006, to get jobs in newly developed shipbuilding and machinery industry.

Industry
Traditionally, Sacheon was an important port through which marine products were transported to Jinju City, an important city of southern part of Korea. And as fish was abundant in this Bay, fishery was the most important industry before modernization.

After the 1990s, the municipal government is supporting aircraft manufacturing industry in the region. Korean Aerospace Industries Ltd  has factories in this city with its 2800 employees. And the local government is also supporting shipbuilding industry. SPP Plant and Shipbuilding Co  is the biggest one in the city.

Threats
The local government has a plan to reclaim almost two million square meters of land from Gwangpo Bay for the shipbuilding industry. The government expects the cost would be 350 billion South Korean wons (350 million US dollars).  But this plan is not the first one. Even in the 1990s, a company was planning to reclaim this tidal flat. The debates between reclamation and protection have continued since then.

Actions
The local branch of Friends of the Earth made a civil research group to study the ecology of this Bay. The group conducted monthly research from 2000 to 2007. Perhaps because of such efforts, the plan to reclaim this Bay was not accepted by the central government on July 8, 2008. But the local government has not given up the plan for reclamation, preparing for the next review by the central government.

References

Geography of South Korea